The 2016–17 EFL Championship (referred to as the Sky Bet Championship for sponsorship reasons) was the first season of the EFL Championship under its current name, and the twenty-fifth season under its current league structure. Newcastle United were crowned the champions and were promoted to Premier League after just one season in the Championship. Brighton & Hove Albion, alongside Huddersfield Town, both achieved their first ever Premier League promotions, via the second automatic promotion place and play-off route respectively.

The season started on 5 August 2016 with the final round of regular league fixtures played on 7 May 2017. The fixtures were announced on 22 June 2016.

Teams 

A total of 24 teams contested the league, including 18 sides from the 2015–16 season, three relegated from the 2015–16 Premier League and three promoted from the 2015–16 Football League One. The 2016–17 season was the first in which former European Cup winners Aston Villa played football outside of the top flight since the beginning of the Premier League era in 1992.

Team changes

To Championship
Promoted from League One
 Wigan Athletic
 Burton Albion
 Barnsley
Relegated from Premier League
 Newcastle United
 Norwich City
 Aston Villa

From Championship
Relegated to League One
 Charlton Athletic
 Milton Keynes Dons
 Bolton Wanderers
Promoted to Premier League
 Burnley
 Middlesbrough
 Hull City

Stadiums and locations

Personnel and sponsoring

 1 According to current revision of List of current Premier League and English Football League managers.

League table

Managerial changes

Play-offs 

The four teams that finished from third to sixth played off, with the winning team, Huddersfield Town, gaining the final promotion spot to the Premier League.

In the play-off semi-finals the third-placed team played the sixth-placed team and the fourth-placed team played the fifth-placed team. The team that finished in the higher league position played away in the first leg and played at home in the second leg. If the aggregate score was level after both legs, then extra time was played. If the scores were still level, a penalty shoot-out decided the winner. The away goals rule does not apply in the playoffs.

The winners from the two semi-finals played at Wembley Stadium in the play-off final. The game is known as the richest game in football as the winning club is guaranteed significantly increased television rights payments estimated to be in the order of £170M.

Results

Top scorers

Hat-tricks

Monthly awards

Attendances 

Source: Soccerway

Notes

References

 
EFL Championship seasons
1
2
Eng